Viljar Myhra (born 21 July 1996) is a Norwegian footballer who plays for Strømsgodset as a goalkeeper.

Career statistics

Club

References

1996 births
Living people
Norwegian footballers
Odds BK players
Strømsgodset Toppfotball players
Eliteserien players
Sportspeople from Porsgrunn
Norwegian Second Division players
Association football goalkeepers
Sportspeople from Skien